Haselböck is a surname. Notable people with the surname include:

 Hermine Haselböck (born 1967), Austrian opera singer
 Hans Haselböck (1928–2021), Austrian organist, composer, book author, academic teacher (father of Lukas and Martin) 
 Lukas Haselböck (born 1972), Austrian composer, musicologist, and singer
 Martin Haselböck (born 1954), Austrian musical director

German-language surnames